Lawyer Quince is a 1914 British silent comedy film directed by Harold M. Shaw and starring Charles Rock, Lillian Logan and Gregory Scott. It was made by the London Film Company based on a short story by W. W. Jacobs.

Cast
 Charles Rock - Lawyer Quince
 Lillian Logan - Celia Rose
 Gregory Scott - Ned Quince
 Mary Brough - Mrs Quince
 Judd Green - Farmer Rose

References

External links

1914 films
1914 comedy films
Films based on works by W. W. Jacobs
Films directed by Harold M. Shaw
British silent short films
Films set in England
British comedy films
British black-and-white films
Films based on short fiction
1910s English-language films
1910s British films
Silent comedy films